Özgüç is a Turkish surname and male given name formed by the combination of the Turkish words öz ("gist; kernel") and güç ("power", "strength", "force") and may refer to:

Surname 
 Agah Özgüç (born 1932), Turkish journalist
 Naci Özgüç (born 1964), Turkish conductor
 Nimet Özgüç (1916–2015), Turkish archaeologist
 Tahsin Özgüç (1916–2005), Turkish archaeologist

Given name 
 Özgüç Türkalp (born 1974), Turkish football referee

References

Turkish-language surnames
Turkish masculine given names